Ivan Milošević (born 3 November 1984) is a Serbian professional footballer who plays as a defender for Mladost Lučani.

Career
Milošević began his career at Mladost Lučani in 2002. He later spent one season with Radnički Beograd, before returning to Mladost Lučani in 2005. In the summer of 2008, Milošević moved abroad and joined Ukrainian side Karpaty Lviv. He spent the next five seasons there, making over 130 official appearances for the club. Milošević subsequently returned to his homeland and signed with Napredak Kruševac in early 2014.

In July 2014, Milošević moved abroad for the second time and signed with Uzbek League club Bunyodkor. He played with them for two seasons, losing back-to-back Uzbekistan Cup finals in 2014 and 2015. In June 2016, Milošević rejoined his parent club Mladost Lučani.

Career statistics

Honours
Mladost Lučani
 Serbian First League: 2006–07
 Serbian Cup: Runner-up 2017–18
Bunyodkor
 Uzbekistan Cup: Runner-up 2014, 2015

References

External links

 
 

Association football defenders
Expatriate footballers in Ukraine
Expatriate footballers in Uzbekistan
FC Bunyodkor players
FC Karpaty Lviv players
First League of Serbia and Montenegro players
FK Mladost Lučani players
FK Napredak Kruševac players
FK Radnički Beograd players
Serbia and Montenegro footballers
Serbian expatriate footballers
Serbian expatriate sportspeople in Ukraine
Serbian expatriate sportspeople in Uzbekistan
Serbian First League players
Serbian footballers
Serbian SuperLiga players
Sportspeople from Čačak
Ukrainian Premier League players
Uzbekistan Super League players
1984 births
Living people